Daniel Belknap (February 9, 1771 – October 3, 1815) was a farmer, mechanic, militia captain, poet and singing teacher. 

Belknap was born in Framingham, Massachusetts, and was an American composer of the First New England School. He compiled four sacred tunebooks in the years 1797–1806, and also issued a book of secular songs with music. He died in Pawtucket, Rhode Island.

Publications
The Harmonist's Companion - Boston: printed by Thomas & Andrews, Oct. 1797
The Evangelical Harmony - Boston: Thomas & Andrews, Sept. 1800
The Middlesex Collection of Sacred Harmony- Boston: Thomas & Andrews, Nov. 1802
The Village Compilation of Sacred Musick - Boston, printed for the author by J.T. Buckingham, 1806
The Middlesex Songster - Dedham: printed by H. Mann, 1809
Judgment Anthem - Dedham: printed by H. Mann, for D. Belknap, 1810

List of works
The Seasons: Spring, Summer, Autumn, Winter - The Gregg Smith Singers
A View of the Temple: A Masonic Ode, sung at the installation of Middlesex Lodge, Framingham, Massachusetts, 1795.

Discography
America Sings, Volume I: The Founding Years (1993)
Under an American Sky

References

External links
 
 

1771 births
1815 deaths
American male composers
American composers
Shape note
People from Framingham, Massachusetts